The 1998 Big West Conference men's basketball tournament was held March 6–8 at Lawlor Events Center in Reno, Nevada.

Utah State defeated  in the championship game, 78–63, to obtain the first Big West Conference Men's Basketball Tournament championship in school history.

The Aggies participated in the 1998 NCAA Division I men's basketball tournament after earning the conference's automatic bid.

Format

The top eight teams were seeded based on regular season conference records.

Bracket

References

Big West Conference men's basketball tournament
Tournament
Big West Conference men's basketball tournament
Big West Conference men's basketball tournament